† Daphnobela miocaenica is an extinct species of predatory sea snail in the family Fasciolariidae.  Fossils of this animal date to the Miocene. This species was first described in 2003.

References

Fasciolariidae
Miocene gastropods
Gastropods described in 2003